Ludvig Andersen (1861–1927) was a Danish architect. Works include the City and Environs Savings Bank, Løgstør (1891) and Pilegården, Pilestræde, Copenhagen (1897–98).

See also
List of Danish architects

References

1861 births
1927 deaths
Danish architects